George Herbert Skinner (1872–1931) was a British boot and shoe manufacturer, enthusiastic pioneer motorist and inventor of a well-known carburettor which remained in production almost the entire twentieth century until superseded by fuel injection systems.

Biography
Herbert Skinner was born in 1872 in Wellingborough the eldest son of boot and shoe manufacturer William Banks Skinner (1847-1914) and his wife born Jane Lilley. In 1881 Banks Skinner entered into a partnership with his brother-in-law, Thomas Lilley (1845-1916), and they built a very successful footwear manufacturing and retailing business, Lilley & Skinner.

The eldest son, Herbert Skinner followed his father into the management of Lilley & Skinner. He brought back Britain's first modern shoe-making machinery from an 1895 visit to USA.

He acquired his first car in 1898 and actively participated in the development of the petrol engine.  Herbert with his brother Carl, Thomas Carlisle Skinner (1882-1958), made a newly developed carburettor in 1904. In February 1905 Herbert applied for a full patent which was granted in January 1906.  The new carburettor was made for the Skinner brothers by G Wailes & Co of Euston Road until the brothers formed a limited liability company in August 1910 to manufacture it themselves. The original brand name Union Carburettor was changed to S. U. carburettor, an abbreviation of Skinner-Union. Younger brother,  Carl (Thomas Carlisle) Skinner (1882-1958) sold out of Lilley & Skinner and took over the carburettor business. Herbert remained with Lilley and Skinner and continued to patent improvements to his carburettor.

He was one of the founders and the vice-president of the Institute of Patentees and well-known in the City of London as an active member of the Cordwainers' Company. He represented England as a clay-bird shot in the 1908 Summer Olympics and won a bronze medal.

Herbert was father of  Professor Herbert Skinner. He did not believe in early schooling.  His son was nine years old before he entered Durston House School at Ealing.

Herbert Skinner died suddenly at his house in Woodville Road, Ealing on 29 December 1931 aged 59.

Notes

References

1872 births
1931 deaths
English businesspeople
English inventors
British male sport shooters
Olympic shooters of Great Britain
Shooters at the 1908 Summer Olympics
Olympic bronze medallists for Great Britain
Olympic medalists in shooting
Medalists at the 1908 Summer Olympics